Roger Arthur Sheldon (born 1942)  is emeritus professor of Biocatalysis and Organic Chemistry at Delft University of Technology in the Netherlands.

Education
Sheldon was educated at the University of Leicester where he was awarded a PhD in 1967 for research on the chemical reactions of the  tetraphenyldiphosphine. supervised by Stuart Trippett and Stephen Davidson.

Career and research
Sheldon is distinguished for his pioneering and wide-ranging contributions to catalytic oxidation, biocatalysis and green chemistry and for bridging the traditional gap between organic synthesis and catalysis. He introduced the concept of the E-factor which is now used by companies globally for assessing the efficiency and environmental impact of chemical processes. He has consistently emphasised the need for a new paradigm in the evaluation of efficiency in chemical processes from the traditional concept of chemical yield to one that assigns value to waste minimisation and is an avid proponent of elegance and precision in organic synthesis.

Awards and honours
Sheldon was elected a Fellow of the Royal Society (FRS) in 2015 and a Fellow of the Royal Society of Chemistry (FRSC) in 1980. He was awarded the Green Chemistry Award by the Royal Society of Chemistry in 2010, and made an Honorary Fellow of the same society in 2018.

References

1942 births
Living people
British chemists
Fellows of the Royal Society
Fellows of the Royal Society of Chemistry
Alumni of the University of Leicester
Academic staff of the Delft University of Technology